Pendromidae is a family of gastropods in the clade Vetigastropoda (according to the taxonomy of the Gastropoda by Bouchet & Rocroi, 2005).

This family is unassigned to superfamily. This family has no subfamilies.

Genera 
Genera in the family Pendromidae include:

 Pendroma Dall, 1927 - type genus of the family Pendromidae
 Pendroma perplexa Dall, 1927
 Rugulina Palazzi, 1988
 Trachysma Jeffreys, 1874

References